Like Colour To The Blind (1996) is the third in a series of four autobiographical works by internationally bestselling autistic author Donna Williams.  Once published in the US using the American spelling 'color', it is now published worldwide by Jessica Kingsley Publishers using the UK spelling 'colour'.  It has been published in several languages worldwide.

Like Colour To The Blind covers Williams' relationship and 'accidental marriage' to 'Ian', a man on the autistic spectrum as she exorcises the vast array of stored behaviours, responses, actions and phrases from her repertoire to discover what is left that is 'self'.  The pair also develop a system called 'checking' which they use to tap into true wants and likes, as the only means of differentiating these from stored or learned responses.

The book relates Williams' diagnosis with scotopic sensitivity syndrome, and her experience with tinted lenses on her visual perceptual disorders including visual fragmentation, context blindness, face blindness, and loss of depth perception. This led to a wide social awakening to visual perceptual disorders in people on the autistic spectrum.

Williams also writes about facilitated communication, covering the story of 'Alex' and quoting his first letters, as he develops communication for the first time through assisted typing, enabling his movement from special education towards a future as a college graduate.

References

External links 
 Donna Williams' website

1996 books
Psychology-related autobiographies
Books about autism
Australian autobiographies

Books about autistic women
Doubleday (publisher) books
Jessica Kingsley Publishers books